The  Greater Saint Louis Air & Space Museum is a museum with the mission to preserve and display historic air and space craft and artifacts, and provide educational programs.

Architecture
The museum is housed in the Curtiss Wright Hangar number two at St. Louis Downtown Airport, Cahokia Heights, Illinois. The adjacent Hangar one and two are listed on the National Register of Historic Places.

The Hangar was completed in March 1930 on the newly opened Curtiss-Stienburg airport. The brick structure featured a cast Curtiss Wright emblem across the doorway. The first occupant of Hangar 2 was St.Louis based Union Electric Company. Its Ford 4-AT-B was used for corporate transport and line patrols, and is now part of the National Naval Aviation Museum. Later it was used for the East St. Louis Flying School. In 1939, Oliver Parks expanded his flight operations to the airport for the Civilian Pilot Training Program. Parks College used the hangar for flight operations until the mid-1990s.

History
The Saint Louis Air & Space Museum was incorporated in July 1982.
The original site for the museum was located at Spirit of St. Louis Airport. The Museum relocated to Cahokia Illinois into the Curtiss-Wright Hangar number two.

Directors

Mark Nankivil...President
Richard (Rick) Rehg...1st Vice President
Carmelo Turdo...2nd Vice President
Albert White...Board Member
Michael Burke...Curator/Board Member
Bob Crandell...Security System Contact/Board Member
Joe Gutknecht...Board Member
Keith Mueller...Board Member
Jean Murry...Treasurer/Board Member
Jack Abercrombie...Honorary Board Member
Tom Ahillen...Docent Coordinator/Board Member
John "Woody" Almind...Board Member
Mark Badasch...Museum Director/Board Member

Gallery of exhibits

 Schempp-Hirth Standard Austria
 Bede BD-5
 Link Trainer
 Lockheed JetStar
 Meyers OTW
 Mini-MAX

See also
List of aerospace museums

References

External links
 

Aerospace museums in Illinois
Museums in St. Clair County, Illinois